Pampanga's 3rd congressional district is one of the four congressional districts of the Philippines in the province of Pampanga. It has been represented in the House of Representatives since 1987. The district consists of the provincial capital city of San Fernando and adjacent municipalities of Arayat, Bacolor, Mexico and Santa Ana. It is currently represented in the 18th Congress by Aurelio Gonzales Jr. of the PDP–Laban.

Representation history

Election results

2022

2019

2016

2013

2010

See also
Legislative districts of Pampanga

References

Congressional districts of the Philippines
Politics of Pampanga
1987 establishments in the Philippines
Congressional districts of Central Luzon
Constituencies established in 1987